Pioneer Award  may refer to:

EFF Pioneer Award, presented by the Electronic Frontier Foundation
SFRA Pioneer Award, presented by the Science Fiction Research Association
NIH Director's Pioneer Award, presented by the National Institutes of Health
GLAAD Pioneer Award, presented by the Gay & Lesbian Alliance Against Defamation
INCOSE Pioneer Award, presented by the International Council on Systems Engineering
 The Pioneer Award by the International Game Developers Association
Pioneer Award, presented by the Rhythm and Blues Foundation
Pioneer Award in Nanotechnology
Pioneer Award (Aviation), presented by the IEEE Aerospace and Electronic Systems Society.